David Thomas Gallagher (born September 20, 1960) is an American former professional baseball journeyman outfielder, who played in Major League Baseball (MLB) for seven teams, during his nine-year big league career (–).

Early life
Gallagher was born in Trenton, New Jersey, and grew up in the suburban Hamilton Square section of Hamilton Township, Mercer County, New Jersey. He played in the Nottingham Little League and — as a centerfielder —led Steinert High School to the Central Jersey title in its group and then to the state title for that group.

Early years
Gallagher played college baseball at Mercer County Community College.

Gallagher was originally drafted third overall by the Oakland Athletics in the January  amateur draft, but did not sign. Five months later, the Cleveland Indians selected him eighth overall in the June secondary draft, and he signed.

He spent seven seasons in the minors, batting .271 with 39 home runs and 316 runs batted in, when he attended spring training with the Indians in 1987. He was cut just at the end of Spring, but was immediately re-added to the major league roster when center fielder Brett Butler fractured his left middle finger in the home opener. In fourteen games in center field, Gallagher batted .111 with one double, one triple and one RBI. Upon Butler's return, he was optioned back to the triple A Buffalo Bisons. Shortly afterwards, he was traded to the Seattle Mariners for relief pitcher Mark Huismann. Despite batting .306 with 46 RBIs for the triple A Calgary Cannons, Gallagher did not fit into the Mariners' future plans, and asked for his release.

Chicago White Sox
In his first game for the Chisox, Gallagher went two for three with a triple, a walk two RBIs and two runs scored to lead his team to a 7–5 victory over the Toronto Blue Jays. The following day, he hit a home run off Mark Eichhorn in the thirteenth inning for the walk off victory over Toronto.

Gallagher continued his hot hitting, and became the White Sox starting center fielder for the remainder of the season. He batted .303 with five home runs and 31 RBIs as a rookie to be named the Topps Rookie All-Star center fielder in 1988 and finish fifth in American League Rookie of the Year balloting. He also developed into one of the top fielding outfielders in the American League.

An injury early in the  season sidelined Gallagher. When he came back, he found that he had lost his starting job in center field to speedster Lance Johnson. He remained a fourth outfielder for the Sox until the Baltimore Orioles acquired him in a waiver deal on August 2.

California Angels
At the 1990 Winter meetings, he was dealt to the California Angels for two minor leaguers. Platooning with Junior Felix in center, Gallagher batted .293 with one home run and thirty RBIs.  On May 19, 1991, Gallagher recorded his first and only 5 hit game going 5-5, clubbing five singles, versus his former team the Baltimore Orioles. On December 10, 1991, he joined his fourth team in a little over a year when he was dealt to the New York Mets for Hubie Brooks.

New York Mets
Gallagher was used primarily as a pinch hitter and late inning defensive replacement during his two-season stay in New York City. On July 18, Gallagher hit his only career grand slam against the San Francisco Giants' Michael Jackson. For the season, he hit a career high six home runs despite logging just 201 at-bats. On November 24, 1993, he was traded to the Atlanta Braves for pitcher Pete Smith.

Final years
After just one season in Atlanta, Gallagher signed as a free agent with the Philadelphia Phillies. After batting just .190 as a pinch hitter with the Braves, Gallagher went six for ten with four doubles pinch hitting for the Phillies. He was traded back to the first place California Angels shortly after the non-waiver trade deadline for minor leaguer Kevin Flora and a player to be named later.

Though the Angels were interested in bringing Gallagher back for the  season, the two sides were unable to reach an agreement. He ended up signing a minor league deal with the Cleveland Indians with an invitation to Spring training. He was cut on March 22, and retired.

Teaching the game

While in the minors, Gallagher invented the "Stride tutor" to help batters regulate their strides. In , Gallagher opened the Dave Gallagher Baseball Academy.

In 2001, Gallagher opened a baseball camp near his home in Millstone Township, New Jersey.

Sources

External links

Dave Gallagher at Ultimate Mets Database

1960 births
Atlanta Braves players
Baltimore Orioles players
California Angels players
Chicago White Sox players
Cleveland Indians players
New York Mets players
Philadelphia Phillies players
Baseball players from Trenton, New Jersey
People from Hamilton Township, Mercer County, New Jersey
People from Millstone Township, New Jersey
Steinert High School alumni
Living people
Mercer County Community College alumni
Batavia Trojans players
Waterloo Indians players
Maine Guides players
Chattanooga Lookouts players
Vancouver Canadians players
Calgary Cannons players
Tidewater Tides players
Buffalo Bisons (minor league) players